The 1929 Humboldt State Lumberjacks football team represented Humboldt State College during the 1929 college football season. They competed as an independent. The 1929 team played a greatly expanded schedule, moving from 3 games to 6.

The 1929 Lumberjacks were led by third-year head coach Fred Telonicher. They played home games at Albee Stadium in Eureka, California. Humboldt State finished with a record of one win, four losses and one tie (1–4–1). The Lumberjacks outscored their opponents 38–37 in the three games.

Schedule

Notes

References

Humboldt State
Humboldt State Lumberjacks football seasons
Humboldt State Lumberjacks football